Carl Moritz Gottsche (3 July 1808 – 28 September 1892) was a German physician and bryologist born in Altona. He was the father of geologist Carl Christian Gottsche (1859-1909).

Gottsche was a leading authority of Hepaticae. With Christian Gottfried Daniel Nees von Esenbeck (1776-1858) and Johann Bernhard Wilhelm Lindenberg (1781-1851), he was author of Synopsis Hepaticarum (1844-47), which was a landmark work in the field of hepaticology.

In 1881 he received an honorary doctorate in philosophy from the University of Kiel.

The botanical genera of liverworts; Gottschea in the family Schistochilaceae is named after him, as well as Gottschelia, which is in the family Cephaloziellaceae.

References

External links
 Stephani’s Species Hepaticarum Revisited
  Guide To The Bryophytes Of Colorado

19th-century German botanists
Bryologists
1808 births
1892 deaths
Scientists from Hamburg